Gowmelian (also Romanized as Gowmelīān; also known as Gomelyan, Gowmelān, Gūmeyan, Gūmlīān, and Komlīān) is a village in Mangur-e Sharqi Rural District, Khalifan District, Mahabad County, West Azerbaijan Province, Iran. At the 2006 census, its population was 141, in 25 families.

References 

Populated places in Mahabad County